Dover City Schools is a school district in Dover, Tuscarawas County, Ohio, United States.  
Dover High School was built in 1915, turning 100 in 2015

Schools 
 Dover High School
 Dover Middle School
 Dover Avenue Elementary School
 Dover East Elementary School
 Dover South Elementary School

See also 
 East Central Ohio ESC

External links 
 

School districts in Ohio
Education in Tuscarawas County, Ohio